Cambroncino is a village and alqueria located in the municipality of Caminomorisco, in Cáceres province, Extremadura, Spain. As of 2020, it has a population of 207.

Geography 
Cambroncino is located 146km north of Cáceres.

References

Populated places in the Province of Cáceres